Tate is an English surname.

Geographical distribution
As of 2014, 65.2% of all known bearers of the surname Tate were residents of the United States (1:4,100), 13.9% of India (1:40,721), 8.5% of England (1:4,850), 2.6% of Australia (1:6,843), 1.6% of Canada (1:16,826) and 1.1% of Syria (1:13,112).

In England, the frequency of the surname was higher than average (1:4,850) in the following counties:

 1. Tyne and Wear (1:1,073)
 2. Northumberland (1:1,378)
 3. Durham (1:1,404)
 4. East Riding of Yorkshire (1:1,623)
 5. West Yorkshire (1:1,816)
 6. North Yorkshire (1:2,083)
 7. Northamptonshire (1:2,447)
 8. South Yorkshire (1:3,631)
 9. East Sussex (1:3,643)
 10. Isle of Wight (1:4,318)
 11. Lincolnshire (1:4,460)
 12. Nottinghamshire (1:4,481)
 13. Norfolk (1:4,516)
 14. Cumbria (1:4,564)
 15. Suffolk (1:4,619)
 16. Hertfordshire (1:4,800)
 17. Wiltshire (1:4,813)

In the United States, the frequency of the surname was higher than average (1:4,100) in the following states:

 1. Mississippi (1:1,128)
 2. Tennessee (1:1,192)
 3. Arkansas (1:1,594)
 4. Louisiana (1:1,609)
 5. Alabama (1:1,741)
 6. Oklahoma (1:2,039)
 7. North Carolina (1:2,154)
 8. South Carolina (1:2,223)
 9. Missouri (1:2,261)
 10. Virginia (1:2,568)
 11. Georgia (1:2,984)
 12. Illinois (1:3,258)
 13. Washington, D.C. (1:3,490)
 14. West Virginia (1:3,577)
 15. Maryland (1:3,875)
 16. Texas (1:3,994)

Notable people with the surname "Tate" include

A
A. Austin Tate (1894–1943), American football player and coach
Al Tate (1918–1993), American baseball player
Alan Tate (born 1982), English football coach
Albert Tate Jr. (1920–1986), American judge
Allen Tate (1899–1979), American poet
Allen Tate (musician) (born 1989), American vocalist
Andrew Tate (born 1986), British-American kick boxer and Internet personality
Auden Tate (born 1997), American football player
Austin Tate (born 1951), English professor

B
Baby Tate (1916–1972), American guitarist
Baby Tate (rapper) (born 1996), American rapper
Barbara Tate (1927–2009), British artist
Ben Tate (born 1988), American football player
Bennie Tate (1901–1973), American baseball player
Bill Tate (disambiguation), multiple people
Brandon Tate (born 1987), American football player
Brent Tate (born 1982), Australian rugby league footballer
Brian Tate (1921–2011), Northern Irish scholar
Bruce Tate, American author
Buddy Tate (1913–2001), American saxophonist

C
Cassandra Tate (born 1990), American sprinter
Catherine Tate (born 1969), British comedian and actress
Cecil Tate (1908–1997), English cricketer
Charlie Tate (1919–1996), American football player
Chris Tate (footballer) (born 1977), English footballer
Christopher G. Tate (born 1964), English biologist
Claudia Tate (1947–2002), English professor
Clyde J. Tate II (born 1957), American lawyer
Cullen Tate (1886–1947), American film director

D
Danny Tate (born 1955), American musician
Darren Tate (born 1972), British musician
Darwin William Tate (1889–1962), American politician
Davanzo Tate (born 1985), American football player
David Tate (disambiguation), multiple people
Deborah Tate, American politician
Derek Tate (born 1980), Australian cricketer
Dillon Tate (born 1994), American baseball player
Don Tate (born 1963), American author
Donavan Tate (born 1990), American football player
Doris Tate (1924–1992), American activist
Drew Tate (born 1984), American football player

E
Edward Tate (1877–1953), English cricketer
Eleanora E. Tate (born 1948), American author
Elizabeth Tate (1906–1999), American activist
Emma Tate (voice actress), British voice actress
Emory Tate (1958–2015), American chess master
E. Ridsdale Tate (1862–1922), British architect
Erin Tate, American drummer
Ernie Tate (1934–2021), Canadian political figure
Erskine Tate (1895–1978), American violinist
Ethlyn Tate (born 1966), Jamaican sprinter

F
Farish Carter Tate (1856–1922), American politician
Francis Tate (1560–1616), English politician
Frank Tate (disambiguation), multiple people
Fred Tate (1867–1943), English cricketer
Frederick Tate (disambiguation), multiple people

G
Geoff Tate (born 1959), American singer
George Tate (disambiguation), multiple people
Georges Tate (1943–2009), French historian
Gerald J. Tate (born 1954), Northern Irish writer
Golden Tate (born 1988), American football player
Grady Tate (1932–2017), American drummer
Greg Tate, American writer
Greg Tate (footballer) (1925–2010), Australian rules footballer

H
Harold Tate (disambiguation), multiple people
Harry Tate (disambiguation), multiple people
Henry Tate (disambiguation), multiple people
Homer Tate (1884–1975), American sculptor
Horace Tate (1922–2002), American educator
Horacena Tate (born 1956), American politician
Howard Tate (1939–2011), American singer
Hughie Tate (1880–1956), American baseball player

I
Ike Tate (1906–1986), English footballer
Isobel Addey Tate (1875–1917), Irish doctor

J
Jack Tate (disambiguation), multiple people
Jackson Tate (1898–1978), American admiral
Jae'Sean Tate (born 1995), American basketball player
Jalen Tate (born 1998), American basketball player
James Tate (disambiguation), multiple people
Jaylon Tate (born 1995), American basketball player
Jeff Tate (disambiguation), multiple people
Jeffrey Tate (1943–2017), English conductor
Jennifer Tate (born 1985), American mixed martial artist
Jenny Tate (born 1960), Australian swimmer
Jerod Impichchaachaaha' Tate (born 1968), American composer
J. Henry Tate (1830–1918), American politician
Jimmy Tate (1912–1984), Australian rules footballer
Joan Tate (1922–2000), English translator
John Tate (disambiguation), multiple people
Joseph Tate (disambiguation), multiple people
Juanita Tate (1938–2004), American activist
J. Waddy Tate (1870–1938), American politician

K
Katherine Tate (born 1962), American political scientist
Keith Tate (1945–2019), English boxer
Kellyn Tate (born 1975), American softball player
Kenny Tate (born 1990), American football player
Kent Tate, Canadian filmmaker
Kevin Tate (1943–2018), New Zealand chemist
Khalil Tate (born 1998), American football player
Kristin Tate, American political commentator

L
Larenz Tate (born 1975), American actor
Lars Tate (1966–2022), American football player
Lee Tate (born 1932), American baseball player
Lincoln Tate (1934–2001), American actor
Lionel Tate (born 1987), American convicted murderer
Louise Tate (born 1965), English swimmer

M
Magnus Tate (1767–1823), American lawyer and politician
Marcia Tate (born 1961), Jamaican sprinter
Mary Magdalena Lewis Tate (1871–1930), American evangelist
Matthew Tate (1837–??), English poet
Maurice Tate (1895–1956), English cricketer
Mavis Tate (1893–1947), British politician
Merze Tate (1905–1996), American professor
Michael Tate (born 1945), Australian politician
Mike Tate (born 1995), Canadian runner 
Miesha Tate (born 1986), American mixed martial artist
Minnie Tate (1857–1899), American singer
Monk Tate (1934–2020), American racing driver

N
Nahum Tate (1652–1715), Irish poet
Nancy Tate, American politician
Nate Tate (born 1979), American politician
Ned Tate (1901–1985), English footballer
Nicholas Tate, English historian
Nick Tate (born 1942), Australian actor
Nikki Tate, Canadian author
Norman Tate (born 1942), American long and triple jumper
Norman Tate (entertainer) (1890–1962), New Zealand entertainer

P
Pamela Tate, New Zealand judge
Patrick Tate (born 1987), American soccer player
Penfield Tate (1931–1993), American politician
Penfield Tate III (born 1956), American politician
Pepsi Tate (1965–2007), Welsh guitarist
Phil Tate (1922–2005), English dancer
Phyllis Tate (1911–1987), English composer
Pop Tate (baseball) (1860–1932), American baseball player

R

Rachael Tate, British sound editor
Ralph Tate (1840–1901), British botanist
Randy Tate (born 1965), American politician
Randy Tate (baseball) (1952–2021), American baseball player
Raphael Tate (born 1984), American singer-songwriter
Reginald Tate (1896–1955), British actor
Reginald Tate (politician) (1954–2019), American politician
Robert Tate (disambiguation), multiple people
Rodney Tate (born 1959), American football player
Roosevelt Tate (1911–1968), American baseball player

S
Saxon Tate (1931–2012), English businessman
Sharon Tate (1943–1969), American actress
Sheila Tate, American secretary
Shirley Anne Tate (born 1956), Jamaican sociologist
Skatemaster Tate (1959–2015), American musician
Sonja Tate (born 1971), American basketball player
Stanley G. Tate (born 1928), American real estate developer
Stephen Tate, British actor
Stu Tate (born 1962), American baseball player
Syd Tate (1925–2015), Australian rules footballer

T
Tanya Tate (born 1979), English model
Tavaris Tate (born 1990), American sprinter
Terry Tate (born 1943), Australian rules footballer
Thomas Tate (disambiguation), multiple people
Tim Tate, American glass sculptor
Tommy Tate (born 1956), American football coach
Tommy Tate (musician) (1945–2017), American singer-songwriter
Troy Tate, English musician
Tristan Tate (born 1988), European Kickboxing Champion

W
Walter Tate (1863–1946), English cricketer
Warren Tate, New Zealand biochemist
Will Tate (born 2001), English rugby league footballer
William Tate (disambiguation), multiple people
Willis M. Tate (1912–1989), American academic administrator
Willy Tate (born 1972), American football player

Z
Zouch Tate (1606–1650), English politician

Fictional characters
Carla Tate, a character on the movie The Other Sister
Chris Tate, a character on the soap opera Emmerdale
Heck Tate, a character in the book To Kill a Mockingbird
Kim Tate, a character in the soap opera Emmerdale
Schuyler Tate, a character in Power Rangers S.P.D.
Zoe Tate, a character on the soap opera Emmerdale

See also
Tata (disambiguation), a disambiguation page for "Tata"
Tate, a disambiguation page for "Tate"
Tate (given name), a page for people with the given name "Tate"
Tait (surname), a page for people with the surname "Tait"
Tait (disambiguation), a disambiguation page for "Tait"
Senator Tate (disambiguation), a disambiguation page for Senators surnamed "Tate"

References

English-language surnames